Chaam is a village in the Dutch province of North Brabant. It is located in the municipality of Alphen-Chaam, about 13 km southeast of Breda.

History 
The village was first mentioned in 1236 as de Cambe, and probably means beer brewery. Chaam is a road village which developed in the Middle Ages.

The Dutch Reformed church was a gothic church from the 16th century. After the destruction on 28 October 1944 by the Germans, only a part was reconstructed. Of the richly decorated tower, only the pear-shared spire and the bell from 1392 could be saved, and a new tower could not be financed; however, it has been placed next to the church. The Catholic Saint Anthony Abt was built between 1925 and 1926. Its tower was blown up in 1944 as well. It was restored and enlarged in 1948, and has been made to resemble the tower of the Dutch Reformed church.

Before the Belgian Revolution (1830-1831), Chaam was the geographic centre of the Kingdom of the Netherlands. It was home to 396 people in 1840. Chaam was a separate municipality until 1997, when it was merged with Alphen.

Sport
Chaam organises annually on the first Wednesday after the Tour de France, the Acht van Chaam, a cycling criterium for professional cyclists.

Gallery

References

Municipalities of the Netherlands disestablished in 1997
Populated places in North Brabant
Former municipalities of North Brabant
Alphen-Chaam